Adkins v. Children's Hospital, 261 U.S. 525 (1923), is a United States Supreme Court opinion that federal minimum wage legislation for women was an unconstitutional infringement of liberty of contract, as protected by the due process clause of the Fifth Amendment.

Adkins was overturned in West Coast Hotel Co. v. Parrish.

Facts
In 1918, Congress passed a law to set minimum wages for women and children in the District of Columbia. As in other cases, the question was one of balancing the police power of Congress to regulate working and living conditions with the right of individuals to conduct their own affairs without legislative interference. Children's Hospital and a female elevator operator at a hotel brought the case to prevent enforcement of the act by Jesse C. Adkins and the two other members of a wage board.

Judgement

The Court's decision, by Justice Sutherland, was that previous decisions (Muller v. Oregon, 208 U.S. 412 (1908) and Bunting v. Oregon, 243 U.S. 426 (1917)) did not overrule the holding in Lochner v. New York, 198 U.S. 45 (1905), which protected freedom of contract. The previous decisions, he noted, addressed maximum hours. The present case addressed a minimum wage. The maximum-hour laws left the parties free to negotiate about wages, unlike the present law, which restricted the employer's side of the negotiation. The Court argued that if legislatures were permitted to set minimum wage laws, they would be permitted to set maximum wage laws.  Sutherland asserted: 

Sutherland cited the changes that had occurred in the years since Muller, particularly the Nineteenth Amendment, which guaranteed the right to vote for women.  He notes that Muller and other cases had emphasized differences between men and women as justifying special protection for women, but "[in] view of the great—not to say revolutionary—changes which have taken place since [Muller], in the contractual, political, and civil status of women, culminating in the Nineteenth Amendment, it is not unreasonable to say that these differences have now come almost, if not quite, to the vanishing point."

Dissents

Taft

Chief Justice Taft, dissenting, argued that there was no distinction between minimum wage laws and maximum hour laws since both were essentially restrictions on contract. He noted that Lochners limitations seemed to have been overruled in Muller and Bunting.

Holmes
Justice Holmes, also dissenting, noted that there were many other constraints on contract (such as blue laws and usury laws). He cited the standard that he had put forth in Lochner: if a reasonable person could see a power in the Constitution, the Court should defer to legislation that used such a power.

References

Sources 
Bernstein, David E. Rehabilitating Lochner: Defending Individual Rights against Progressive Reform. Chapter 4. Chicago: University of Chicago Press, 2011.

External links

 

United States Supreme Court cases of the Taft Court
United States labor case law
United States substantive due process case law
1923 in United States case law
Minimum wage law
Overruled United States Supreme Court decisions
1923 in women's history
United States Supreme Court cases